Huberantha is a genus of plants in the family Annonaceae and tribe Miliuseae. It is distributed in Australia, tropical Asia, East Africa and some Pacific islands. Tanawat Chaowasku named the genus "Huber's flowers" in honor of the German botanist Herbert Huber and to highlight its flowers as a distinguishing feature of the genus.  A number of species have been moved here from the genus Polyalthia.

Description
The leaf veins of Huberantha form an interconnected net-like pattern.  Their flowers are axillary.  They have a single ovule and seed per ovary.  A portion of their ovules remain fused to the seed coat forming a flat raphe.  Their seed coats form spine-like intrusions into their endosperm.  A layer of the outer pollen wall, called the infratectum, has a granular appearance.

Species
Plants of the World Online lists:
 Huberantha amoena (A.C.Sm.) Chaowasku
 Huberantha asymmetrica I.M.Turner & Utteridge
 Huberantha capillata (A.C.Sm.) Chaowasku
 Huberantha ceramensis (Boerl.) Chaowasku
 Huberantha cerasoides (Roxb.) Chaowasku - type species
 Huberantha decora (Diels) Chaowasku
 Huberantha flava (Merr.) I.M.Turner
 Huberantha forbesii (F.Muell. ex Diels) Chaowasku
 Huberantha gracilis (Burck) Chaowasku
 Huberantha henrici (Diels) Chaowasku
 Huberantha hirta (Miq.) Chaowasku
 Huberantha humblotii (Drake ex Cavaco & Keraudren) Chaowasku
 Huberantha jenkinsii (Hook.f. & Thomson) Chaowasku
 Huberantha keraudreniae (Le Thomas & G.E.Schatz) Chaowasku
 Huberantha korinti (Dunal) Chaowasku
 Huberantha leptopoda (Diels) Chaowasku
 Huberantha loriformis (Gillespie) Chaowasku
 Huberantha luensis (Pierre) Chaowasku
 Huberantha mossambicensis (Vollesen) Chaowasku
 Huberantha multistamina (G.E.Schatz & Le Thomas) Chaowasku
 Huberantha nitidissima (Dunal) Chaowasku
 Huberantha palawanensis (Merr.) I.M.Turner
 Huberantha papuana (Scheff.) I.M.Turner
 Huberantha pendula (Capuron ex G.E.Schatz & Le Thomas) Chaowasku
 Huberantha perrieri (Cavaco & Keraudren) Chaowasku
 Huberantha rumphii (Blume ex Hensch.) Chaowasku
 Huberantha sambiranensis (Capuron ex Le Thomas & G.E.Schatz) Chaowasku
 Huberantha senjiana (R.Mural., Naras. & N.Balach.) R.Mural., Naras. & N.Balach.
 Huberantha stuhlmannii (Engl.) Chaowasku
 Huberantha tanganyikensis (Vollesen) Chaowasku
 Huberantha trichoneura (Diels) Chaowasku
 Huberantha verdcourtii (Vollesen) Chaowasku
 Huberantha vitiensis (Seem.) Chaowasku
 Huberantha whistleri I.M.Turner & Utteridge

References

 
Annonaceae genera